Southwick  is a village in Hampshire,  England.  north of the Portsmouth boundary measured from Portsea Island. Homes and farms in the village are influenced by the style of the Middle Ages apart from Church Lodge.

History

Southwick was initially the site of Southwick Priory, in the 12th century. On the Dissolution of the Monasteries during the Reformation the estate, including the village, was granted to John White.

Southwick House, a new manor house was completed in 1813. This house was gutted by fire in 1838, and was renovated and rebuilt by 1841. The house and part of the estate was requisitioned by the government during World War II, when the house was Dwight Eisenhower's SHAEF headquarters for Operation Overlord, or D-Day, the cross-channel invasion of Normandy. The house has been used by various branches of the armed forces, including as HMS Dryad, ever since.

Southwick is rare in that the village is still entirely owned by the Southwick Estate (except for Church Lodge). The most obvious sign of this is that all the houses, except manor houses, have dark red-painted front doors - a condition laid down in the tenancy agreements. The only exceptions to this are the White House, the residence of the vicar and Church Lodge. Church Lodge is the only privately owned house in the old village and is shown in the fourth picture below. The church itself is a Grade I listed early medieval building, known as St James, but officially "St James without (i.e. outside) the priory gate".
The Defence School of Policing and Guarding is situated at nearby Southwick Park.  
As of 16 October 2011 the FirstGroup bus services providing travel to the village residents has been withdrawn. The only shop within the village is located opposite the church and is known as Southwick Village Stores.

The Golden Lion public house was the unofficial officers mess during WW2 the lounge bar used by Eisenhower, Bradley, and numerous other American generals; also Montgomery, Prince Philip and Earl Mountbatten, according to persons that were there during this period. Even  Jan Smuts visited.

Gallery

References

External links

Southwick